Qeshlaq-e Hajj Tumar Hajj Jamshid Shahbazi (also Romanized as Qeshlāq-e Ḩājj Tūmār Ḩājj Jamshīd Shahbāzī) is a village in Qeshlaq-e Shomali Rural District, in the Central District of Parsabad County, Ardabil Province, Iran. At the 2006 census, its population was 169, in 32 families.

References 

Towns and villages in Parsabad County